Llanymawddwy is a village in Gwynedd, Wales, which is to the north of the larger village of Dinas Mawddwy, on the minor road which connects Dinas Mawddwy to Llanuwchllyn over Bwlch y Groes. The most notable building is the parish church dedicated to Saint Tydecho, where the tradition of singing Matins endures.

A. G. Edwards, the first Archbishop of the disestablished Church in Wales, was born in Llanymawddwy in 1848.

According to local tradition, Bryn Hall was once haunted by a headless horseman. The haunting is said to have ceased after a grave belonging to the Lord's illegitimate child was found near the hall.

References

External links 

www.geograph.co.uk : photos of Llanymawddwy and surrounding area

Villages in Gwynedd
Villages in Snowdonia
Mawddwy